F.C.D. Conegliano 1907 (or simply Conegliano) is an Italian football club based in Conegliano near Treviso in Veneto. Currently it plays in Italy's Promozione.

The team has played three seasons in Serie C.

Colors and badge
The team's colors are yellow and blue.

Stadium
Currently the team plays at the Narciso Soldan Stadium.

Notable players
  Stephen Makinwa (2000–2001)
  Marcelo Aparicio Mateos (2003–2004)
  Azdren Llullaku (2004–2006)

References

External links
Official website 

Conegliano
Conegliano